6Degrees (or Six Degrees) is a Northern Irish dramatic television series about a group of university students living in Belfast. It premiered on 21 February 2012 on BBC2 NI. In July 2013 it also began airing on the Irish channel RTÉ 2 and later on BBC1 NI. The show ran for a total of three series, between 2012 and 2015. It was filmed on location in Northern Ireland.

The series charts the lives of several young students, who befriend one another when they embark on their various degree courses. Each series explores their changing friendships, as they struggle with work, relationships and family life. The show received praise for its diverse and vibrant depiction of present-day Belfast, as well as its lively young cast.

Cast

Main characters 
  (Jayne Wisener), is the idealist of the group, always eager to resolve conflict and lend support. From a privileged family on the Causeway Coast, she is keen to make new friends and explore the big city whilst studying for her degree in accountancy. Kind and somewhat naive, Sandie is easily upset when things go wrong but strives to develop her independence.
  (Cillian O'Sullivan), arrives in Belfast all the way from Cork. Tall, dark and mysterious, he captures the attention of Sandie but must come to terms with his true self. One of the lads, he's always up for the craic and enjoys himself most on the football field. He is loyal to his friends and is studying to be an architect but, with little direction or ambition, his path remains unclear. After college, he returns to Cork before moving to New York.
  (Jamie-Lee O'Donnell) is from Derry. She arrives in a new city with aspirations of becoming a solicitor. Her frank and impulsive nature often leads to trouble, creating tension with those around her. Eva loves to party and speak her mind but her apparent confidence hides insecurities and a tragic past. She will fiercely defend her friends but tends to put herself first.
  (Ryan McParland) A geek at heart, Leech (as he prefers to be known) desires acceptance and popularity the most and will do anything to attain it. Loud, boastful and slightly wild, he's always up for adventure and fun. Leech's nemesis is childhood bully Gary Meadows and he has a secret crush on fellow gamer Carly. Above all, Leech wants to embrace the moment and have fun but he soon discovers that life won't always be carefree.
  (Georgia Maguire) (series 1–2, recurring 3) Savvy Londoner Jess moves to Belfast for University, leaving behind her boyfriend. Initially, she finds it difficult to adapt to the new city and local lingo but (most) of her housemates make her feel welcome. Sensible and studious, Jess often clashes with Eva and develops a soft spot for Danny. She decides to leave the gang after second year to go travelling but keeps in touch with Sandie. She ultimately returns to Belfast to continue her studies.
  (Niall Wright) (series 1–2, recurring 3) Born and bred in Belfast, Danny is kind and genuine and keen to pursue (and share) his love of film through his studies. His feelings are torn between bright housemate Jess and the ardent Eva. He struggles to cope with his mum's alcoholism but often finds escapism through his new friends and passion. He leaves Belfast, before the end of his final year, after accepting a work placement in London, but still has hopes for love with Eva. He later returns, for unspecified reasons.
  (Ben Peel) (series 1, recurring 2-3) Self-assured, smart and trendy, Justin is always willing to stand up for his beliefs and won't shy away from confrontation. He meets the rest of the gang through Eva and takes a fancy to Conor but finds it difficult to keep their relationship a secret. He is deeply ambitious and independent, ready to accept any gainful opportunities that come his way. He eventually decides to leave for New York but still pines for Conor.
  (Lauren Ellis-Steele) (series 3, recurring previously) Hailing from Glasgow, Carly is a friendly, caring and insightful girl. She quickly develops an attraction to Leech based on their mutual love of gaming. Loyal and committed, she soon befriends the rest of the gang but is frustrated by Leech's apparent fickle ways. She eventually moves into the house with the others and faces a major life decision that will ultimately affect her relationship with Leech.
  (Dermot Murphy) (series 3) Liam crashes onto the scene just as the friends are preparing for their final semester, taking Danny's place in the house. He wastes no time making a move on Conor and causing mischief for the friends with his roguish ways. Liam is carefree and fun-loving, striking immediate accord with Leech but clashing with Eva and Sandie. His reckless and sometimes fickle attitude causes rifts in the gang. He eventually moves to Dublin.

Episodes

Series overview

Series 1 (2012)

Series 2 (2013)

Series 3 (2015)

Reception 
Christine Keighery, of the Crossmaglen Examiner, praised the show for its local talent - "Written by, filmed in and starring actors from the North, the series is being hailed as a, long overdue, return to home-grown drama." However, Lee Henry, writing for Culture Northern Ireland criticised the series during its first season, in comparison to long-running British soap opera Hollyoaks, for aiming a teen drama at an adult audience. Likewise, the News Letter drew comparisons with Hollyoaks but also commended the local talent, describing it as "...exciting because it’s a Northern Irish drama - a rare and therefore precious offering."

By the third series, Joe Nawaz, writing in the Belfast Telegraph, generally praised the series as smart and youthful, but criticised some of the dialogue and the attempt to "re-imagine Belfast as a kind of fantasy cosmopolitan postcard destination."

References

External links 
 
 Official website
 BBC website
BBC Northern Ireland television shows
2010s television series from Northern Ireland
2012 British television series debuts
2015 British television series endings